Janet Jonsson (born 20 July 1977) is a Swedish snowboarder. She was born in Västerbotten. She competed at the 2002 Winter Olympics, in halfpipe.

References

External links 
 

1977 births
Living people
People from Västerbotten
Swedish female snowboarders
Olympic snowboarders of Sweden
Snowboarders at the 2002 Winter Olympics
21st-century Swedish women